Cornelius John Pasichny  (27 March 1927 in Winnipeg – 30 January 2014 in Toronto) was the Eparch of the Ukrainian Catholic Eparchy of Saskatoon (1995–1998) and of the Ukrainian Catholic Eparchy of Toronto and Eastern Canada (1998–2003) in Canada.

Early life
At age 15 he joined the Order of St Basil the Great, and after novitiate studied philosophy and theology in Canada and then at the Pontifical Gregorian University in Rome.

Priesthood
Pasichny was ordained as a priest by Bishop Ivan Bucko on 5 July 1953. He continued his studies by obtaining a Licenciate in Philosophy from the Gregorian University the following year.

In November 1995 he was nominated as bishop of the Ukrainian Greek Catholic Church.

External links
GCatholic.org information
Catholic-Hierarchy.org information
 RISU News Service article about Bishop Pasichny's death

1927 births
2014 deaths
Canadian people of Ukrainian descent
Order of Saint Basil the Great
People from Winnipeg
Pontifical Gregorian University alumni
Canadian members of the Ukrainian Greek Catholic Church
Bishops of the Ukrainian Greek Catholic Church in Canada
Eastern Catholic bishops in Canada